The Well-Mannered War is a Virgin Missing Adventures original novel written by Gareth Roberts based on the long-running British science fiction television series Doctor Who. It features the Fourth Doctor, Romana and K-9. This was the final book in the Missing Adventures Range.

Plot
Two factions have laid claim to the planet Barclow: humans from Metralubit, and the Chelonians. But instead of fighting, for nearly two hundred years, the two sides are the best of friends.

The Doctor, Romana and K-9 arrive to find an important election looming. K-9 begins a career in politics, Romana reunites with an old friend, and the Doctor discovers a plot to alter the war's friendly nature. And what has Galatea, leader of the beautiful Femdroids, got to do with this?

Rarity
The novel is one of a number of Virgin Doctor Who novels which sell for far in excess of their cover price, especially on online auction sites such as eBay and Amazon. This is believed to be due to high demand for the books after Virgin lost their licence to publish original Doctor Who fiction. Lungbarrow and The Dying Days are similar in this respect, as they were the two final Virgin New Adventures to be published.

Audio adaptation
In April 2015, Big Finish released a full cast audio adaptation of the story starring Tom Baker, Lalla Ward and John Leeson.

References

External links
The Well-Mannered War at Big Finish

1997 British novels
1997 science fiction novels
Fourth Doctor novels
Virgin Missing Adventures
Novels by Gareth Roberts (writer)
Novels set on fictional planets